Llysfasi College is now part of Coleg Cambria.

Formerly an independent centre for agricultural training in Pentrecelyn, Ruthin, North Wales, Llysfasi College became part of Coleg Cambria when Deeside College merged with Yale College, Wrexham in August 2013.

Coleg Cambria consists of six campuses including Deeside, Yale Grove Park, Yale Bersham Road, Wrexham Training, Llysfasi and Northop.  The encompassed college offers a 
wide range of courses from Further Education to HNC’s and Foundation Degrees for full and part-time students, apprentices and part-time community learners.

History

The manor was built during the late 16th century and the original name, Llys Llannerch, was changed to Llys Masi (Massey's Court) at that time.

The estate was owned by the Myddelton family of Chirk and their descendants from 1633 to 1909, when it was purchased by Charles William Sandles of Cheshire. He had plans to establish it as an agricultural college, but in 1911, due to financial difficulties, he had to sell it to a cotton broker, R. W. Brown from Birkenhead. Brown continued to develop the farm as an agricultural college until 1919, when it was purchased by Denbighshire County Council.

The first principal was Isaac Jones, who was appointed in 1919 and took up office on St David's Day 1920. He was followed by D. S. Edwards (1943–1967) and Maldwyn Fisher (1967–1983). The last principal of the college as an independent establishment was Fred Cunningham (1983–2010) before it became part of the Deeside College Group on 1 August 2010.

Further information and verification for this document can be found in a book written by D. Gwynne Morris–Coleg Llysfasi College 1921–1996 (W. O. Jones (Printers) Ltd).

Location
Llysfasi College is located at the foot of the Nant Y Garth Pass and the college farm extends across about 300 hectares of lowland and upland in Pentrecelyn, near Ruthin, Denbighshire.

References

External links
 Coleg Cambria website
 Coleg Cambria Facebook page

Further education colleges in Denbighshire